Macaranga triloba is a species of plant in the family Euphorbiaceae. It is native to the tropical forests of southeastern Asia. It is a pioneer species, colonising recently cleared or burnt areas of the forest.

Description
The trunk is a light greyish-brown with smooth bark, and the twigs and shoots are largely devoid of hairs. The leaves are tri-lobed and peltate, with toothed margins. Each leaf has two erect, leathery stipules that are ovate, slightly recurved and do not encircle the stem. The inflorescence is a panicle with minute reddish-brown flowers. The fruits are rounded, sticky and yellow when ripe, the carpels developing long, horn-like processes.

Distribution and habitat
Macaranga triloba occurs in Indo-China, the Malay Peninsula, Singapore, Sumatra, Java and the Philippines.

Ecology
Along with other members of its genus, M. triloba is a pioneer species. In 1982 and 1983, fires devastated the Bukit Soeharto Education Forest, in East Kalimantan, Indonesia. In a section of forest regenerating after slash-and-burn forest clearances, Macaranga species predominated after fifteen years, but by thirty years were being replaced by Shorea parvifolia and Pentace laxiflora.

This plant has a mutualistic relationship with predatory ants of the Crematogaster genus. The tree has hollow twigs in which the ants make their nest and provides the ants with food bodies located on the leaf stipules; the ants feed on these and defend the tree against herbivorous insects. Many fewer food bodies are produced by trees that have no ants inhabiting them than are produced by those where ants are present.

Gallery

References

triloba
Flora of Indo-China
Flora of Malesia
Plants described in 1866